Cephalodiscus is a genus of hemichordates in the monotypic family Cephalodiscidae of the order Cephalodiscida.

Description
Unlike Rhabdopleura, Cephalodiscus species do not form large colonies and are only pseudocolonial. Cephalodiscus zooids are also more mobile than their Rhabdopleura counterparts, and are able to move around within tubaria. Cephalodiscus zooids can be produced via asexual budding. There are a few pairs of tentacled arms, whereas Rhabdopleura has only one pair of arms.

Species 
19 living species of Cephalodiscus have been described:

 Cephalodiscus agglutinans Harmer & Ridewood, 1914
 Cephalodiscus atlanticus Bayer, 1962
 Cephalodiscus australiensis Johnston & Muirhead, 1951
 Cephalodiscus calciformis Emig, 1977
 Cephalodiscus densus Andersson 1907 [Cephalodiscus rarus Andersson, 1907; Cephalodiscus anderssoni Gravier 1912]
 Cephalodiscus dodecalophus McIntosh 1882
 Cephalodiscus evansi Ridewood
 Cephalodiscus fumosus John, 1932
 Cephalodiscus gilchristi Ridewood, 1908
 Cephalodiscus gracilis Harmer 1905
 Cephalodiscus graptolitoides Dilly 1993
 Cephalodiscus hodgsoni Ridewood, 1907 [Cephalodiscus aequatus Andersson 1907; Cephalodiscus inaequatus Andersson 1907]
 Cephalodiscus indicus Schepotieff 1909
 Cephalodiscus kempi John, 1932
 Cephalodiscus levinsoni Harmer 1905
 Cephalodiscus nigrescens Lankester 1905
 Cephalodiscus planitectus Miyamoto, Nishikawa and Namikawa, 2020
 Cephalodiscus sibogae Harmer 1905
 Cephalodiscus solidus Andersson, 1907

Cephalodiscus planitectus is the most recently discovered species. It was described in 2020 from specimens found in Sagami Bay off the southern coast of Honshu, Japan.

Extinct species include:
 †Cephalodiscus lutetianus Abrard, Dollfus & Soyer 1950
 †Cephalodiscus nusplingensis Schweigert & Dietl 2013

References

External links 
 
 

Animal genera
Pterobranchia